Hell Is Sold Out is a 1951 British drama film directed by Michael Anderson and starring Mai Zetterling, Herbert Lom and Richard Attenborough. The film is based on the novel of the same name by Maurice Dekobra.

Plot
A Swedish-born woman, Valerie Martin, posing as the widow of French Resistance novelist Dominic Danges, ensconces herself at his home after the end of the Second World War, and after having written under his name "Hell is Sold Out", a best selling novel. She did this after finding that the last book published under his name was a republication of her diary, "Boundless Ecstasy", found by his publisher among his writings when he was thought dead; he had been taken prisoner during the war.

He returns home. The tangle ensues putting the reputations of all involved at risk because there is interest in the book to be serialized, made into a film, and reshape his reputation in the US as a former ladies man. They argue and in order to return to Sweden, she calls on Pierre Bonnet, a fellow prisoner of Dominic. She confesses to Pierre that she and Dominic are unmarried, and does not want Dominic to know of her whereabouts. A love triangle develops when Pierre falls in love with her.

Pierre falls ill due to shrapnel in his head, and she is found out when she encounters Dominic in Pierre's room. Dominic lets known that he is not the author of the best seller. Dominic and Pierre have a heart to heart. Pierre misleads Valerie into believing that Dominic has dedicated his latest work to her. They reconcile.

Cast
 Mai Zetterling as Valerie Martin 
 Herbert Lom as Dominic Danges 
 Richard Attenborough as Pierre Bonnet 
 Hermione Baddeley as Mme. Louise Menstrier 
 Nicholas Hannen as François 
 Olaf Pooley as Cheri, male secretary 
 Eric Pohlmann as Louis, the proprietor 
 Mara Lane as Midinette
 Kathleen Byron as Arlette de Balzamann 
 Joan Young as Mrs. Gertrude de Montfort Cole  
 Althea Orr as Mrs. Eunice Weinhardt  
 Virginia Bedard as Mrs. Irma Reinhardt  
 Joan Hickson as Hortense, the housekeeper

Release
The film is on Blu-ray. Amazon.com released the film on DVD on 31 August 2010.

Critical reception
TV Guide wrote, "despite the portentous title, this is a farce, and a good one at that."

References

External links

1951 films
1951 drama films
1950s English-language films
Films directed by Michael Anderson
British drama films
Films about writers
Films set in France
Films based on French novels
British black-and-white films
1950s British films